Gaban is 1966 Hindi film directed by Hrishikesh Mukherjee, based on Munshi Premchand's classic novel by the same name. It had Sunil Dutt and Sadhna playing  the lead role. The film has music by Shankar Jaikishan, and lyrics were by Shailendra and Hasrat Jaipuri.

Plot:
Honest Munshi Dayanath works in the administrative office of the Allahabad High Court in 1928 British India, and lives an impoverished lifestyle along with his wife, a grown slacker son, Ramanath, and two younger sons. Without knowing Ramanath's background, Munshi Dindayal arranges his daughter, Jalpa's marriage, and she moves in with this family. Unable to pay jeweler Gangaram for jewelry purchased for this wedding, Ramanath steals his wife's jewelry, and then gets in debt when he gets her a Chandrahaar. In order to pay for this, he works as a Clerk, collecting money for the regime as well as accepting bribes. Circumstances compel him to embezzle Rs.800/- which he is unable to return. Afraid of being arrested, he flees to Calcutta, gets embroiled indirectly in the freedom struggle, gets arrested and will only be set free if he testifies against non-violent freedom-fighters.

Cast 
 Sunil Dutt as Ramanath
 Sadhna as Jalpa
 Minoo Mumtaz as Zohrajaan
 Badri Prasad as Munshi Dayanath
 Leela Mishra as Jaggo
 Kanhaiyalal as Devideen
 Anwar Hussain as Khan
 C. S. Dubey as Pan Shop Owner
 Pratima Devi as Ramanath's Mother
 Agha as Bade Babu
 Kamal Kapoor as Advocate
 Brahm Bhardwaj as Jalpa's Father
 Zeb Rehman as Ratan

Soundtrack

References

External links 
 

1966 films
1960s Hindi-language films
Indian black-and-white films
Films based on Indian novels
Films directed by Hrishikesh Mukherjee
Films scored by Shankar–Jaikishan
Adaptations of works by Premchand
Films based on works by Premchand